Clímaco Guillermo Rodríguez González is a former Uruguayan footballer who played as a defender.

Club career
Rodríguez played in his native Uruguay with Defensor Sporting and in Paraguay with Club Guaraní.

Personal life
He is the uncle of former Uruguay international footballer Coquito and great-uncle of current Real Madrid Castilla player Álvaro Rodríguez.

References

Living people
Date of birth unknown
Association football defenders
Uruguayan footballers
Uruguay international footballers
Defensor Sporting players
Club Guaraní players
Uruguayan expatriate footballers
Uruguayan expatriate sportspeople in Paraguay
Expatriate footballers in Paraguay
Year of birth missing (living people)